The Al–Aga Mosque is the oldest Mosque in Kosovo  and in the entire Balkan region. It is located near Dragash and was built in 1289.

According to Islamic community council in Dragaš in 1995 they received formal document by the Mufti office of Aleppo city, in Arab Republic of Syria, where it is clearly stated that a family named Al-Aga have been migrated from Aleppo to former Yugoslav territories, particularly in the area known as Mlika. This family, according to this document, began migrating in 1095 and continued until 1291. The mosque was restored in 1822 by Ahmed Agha.

This mosque lies in the southern part of Kosovo and has been reconstructed several times during its history, thanks to volunteer donations of the community and people of the good will. It is still active and quite a good congregation frequents the mosque especially during Friday (Juma) prayers.

References 

Mosques in Kosovo
Dragash